Philippe-Emmanuel de Lorraine, Duke of Mercœur and of Penthièvre (9 September 1558, in Nomeny, Meurthe-et-Moselle – 19 February 1602, in Nürnberg) was a French soldier, a prince of the Holy Roman Empire and a prominent member of the Catholic League.

Life 
Philippe-Emmanuel de Lorraine, Duke of Mercoeur was born on 9 September 1558 in Nomeny, France, the eldest surviving son of Nicholas, Count of Vaudémont and Jeanne de Savoie-Nemours. In 1575, Mercoeur married Marie de Luxembourg, daughter of Sébastien de Luxembourg, which, together with the title of Duc de Penthièvre, also brought him rights to the crown of the Duchy of Brittany. He was made a knight of the Order of Saint Esprit in 1578.

Rebellion in Brittany
In 1582, after the death of the Duke of Montpensier, he was made governor of Brittany by Henry III of France, who had married his half-sister. In 1588 Mercœur joined the Catholic League in Brittany, and had himself proclaimed protector of the Roman Catholic Church in the province.

His wife's family, the House of Penthièvre, were descendants of the House of Dreux as Dukes of Brittany. The House of Penthièvre had lost the dukedom of Brittany to the House of Montfort in the Breton War of Succession in the 14th century. They had subsequently attempted to overthrow the Montfortist Dukes, with no success. Invoking the alleged hereditary rights of his wife, Mercœur endeavoured to make himself independent in that province, and organized a government at Nantes, calling his son "prince and duke of Brittany".

He formed an alliance with Spain and continued to press for his independence from France when Henry IV became King of France. Henry IV of France sent a force against him led by the duc de Montpensier. With the aid of the Spaniards he defeated the French at the Battle of Craon in 1592. However, the royal troops were reinforced by English contingents and soon recovered the advantage. The king marched against Mercœur in person, and received his submission at Angers on 20 March 1598, the last member of the League to do so. Henry IV assured his control of Brittany through the marriage of his illegitimate son, César Duc de Vendôme, to Mercœur's daughter Francoise.

Later years and death

Mercœur subsequently went to Hungary, where he entered the service of the emperor Rudolph II after answering the call to arms by the Holy Roman Emperor against the Ottomans He fought against the Turks, defeating the Ottomans twice at the siege of Albe-Royale (Székesfehérvár) in 1601. He died after falling sick while returning to Lorraine in 1602. On 27 April, a mass was celebrated for him at Notre Dame de Paris, with the oration delivered by François de Sales.

Family

Philippe married Marie de Luxembourg (1562–1623), Duchesse de Penthièvre and daughter of Sébastien, Duke of Penthièvre, on 12 July 1579 in Paris.

He had two children with Marie:

 Philippe Louis de Lorraine (21 May 1589 – 21 December 1590)
 Françoise de Lorraine, Duchesse de Mercœur et de Penthièvre (November 1592 – 8 September 1669, Paris)

Françoise married César de Bourbon, duc de Vendôme, an illegitimate son of Henry IV of France at Fontainebleau on 16 July 1608.

References

Sources

Further reading
St François de Sales. Oraison funèbre de Philippe-Emmanuel de Lorraine, duc de Mercœur et de Penthièvre. Introduction de Pierre-Olivier Combelles. Editions Saint-Rémi (Cadillac), 2006.

1558 births
1602 deaths
People from Meurthe-et-Moselle
Philippe Emmanuel
Lorraine-Mercoeur, Philippe Emmanuel of, Duke of Mercoeur
Counts of Penthièvre
French expatriates in Hungary
Marquesses of Nomeny
French people of the French Wars of Religion
Philippe Emmanuel
16th-century French nobility
17th-century French nobility
Dukes of Penthièvre